Señorita República Dominicana 1971 was held on January 19, 1971. There were 28 candidates who competed for the national crown. The winner represented the Dominican Republic at the Miss Universe 1971 . The Virreina al Miss Mundo will enter Miss World 1971. Only the 27 province, 1 municipality entered. On the top 10 they showed their evening gown and answered questions so they could go to the top 5. In the top 5 they would answer more questions.

Results

Señorita República Dominicana 1971 : Sagrario Margarita Reyes de los Colmenares (Séibo)
Virreina al Miss Mundo : Haydée Modesta Kuret Tejeda (Barahona)
1st Runner Up : Aida Fernandez (Distrito Nacional)
2nd Runner Up : Mirka Suarez (Santiago)
3rd Runner Up : Nidia Ureña (Puerto Plata)

Top 10

Digna Alvarez (Valverde)
Ana German (Santiago Rodríguez)
Lina Rosado (Dajabón)
Carmen Sosa (San Pedro)
Martha Eros (Monte Cristi)

Special awards
 Miss Rostro Bello – Aida Fernandez (Distrito Nacional)
 Miss Photogenic (voted by press reporters) - Sagrario Reyes (Séibo)
 Miss Congeniality (voted by Miss Dominican Republic Universe contestants) - Digna Alvarez (Valverde)

Delegates

 Azua - Cilinia Marta Parada Acosta
 Baoruco -Ana Elena Ramos Ortiz 
 Barahona - Haydée Modesta Kuret Tejeda
 Dajabón - Ana Lina Rosado Batistas
 Distrito Nacional - Aida Ceneyda Fernandez Hernandez
 Duarte - Ingrid Marie Martens Abreu
 Espaillat - Desiree Agens Verdadero Lozio
 Independencia - Ana Lorena San Lorenzo Taiti
 La Altagracia - Rose Nicole Rodríguez Lony
 La Estrelleta - Rossana Cristina Villalona Moreno
 La Romana - Teresita María Sosa Cano
 La Vega - Sandra María Rodríguez Ferreira
 María Trinidad Sánchez - María Agnes Martín Morazan
 Monte Cristi - Martha María Eros Ramírez
 Pedernales - Ana Freida Holler Figal
 Peravia - Ana Carmencita Betances Lara
 Puerto Plata - Nidia María Carolina Ureña Vargas
 Salcedo - Fatima Clara Taverez Ruiz
 Samaná - Luisa María Oviedo Rey
 Sánchez Ramírez - Ana Germanialette Ríos Ynoa
 San Cristóbal -  Monica Tati Madrago Reyes
 San Juan de la Maguana - Ana Zamia Zamora Suarez
 San Pedro - Carmen Ana Sosa Sosa
 Santiago - Mirka Lola Suarez Rodríguez del Limones
 Santiago Rodríguez - Ana Sandra German Abreu
 Séibo - Sagrario Margarita Reyes de los Colmenares
 Santo Domingo de Guzmán - Veronica Gloria Evete Roman
 Valverde - Digna Jan't Alvarez Ramis

Miss Dominican Republic
1971 beauty pageants
1971 in the Dominican Republic